Pregnancy loss is the death of an embryo or fetus. It may include any of the following:

Unintentional pregnancy loss:
 Miscarriage
 Blighted ovum
 Ectopic pregnancy
 Stillbirth
 Toxic abortion, caused by pollution or chemical exposures

Pregnancy loss through intentional termination:
 Abortion
 Selective reduction to reduce the number of fetuses in a multiple pregnancy
 Hysterotomy abortion, a surgical abortion of a non-viable fetus performed similar to a cesarean section
 Late-term abortion
 Self-induced abortion
 Sex-selective abortion